Boosh may refer to:
 The Mighty Boosh, a British comedy series.
 "Boosh!", a catchphrase used by many characters on the American animated TV program Frisky Dingo.